Fantasy (Gensoukyoku) is the third studio album by Japanese singer Akina Nakamori. It was released on 23 March 1983 under the Warner Pioneer label. The album includes the hit single "Second Love".

Background
Fantasy (Gensoukyoku) is the first studio album released in 1983.

The music production team consisted of a main arranger, Mitsuo Hagita, Akira Ootsu, Kisugi siblings Etsuko and Takao, Shizuka Ijūin, Masao Urino, Hiroaki Serizawa and Toshiyuki Kimori.

"Akina Kara" is a recorded speech message from Nakamori herself with background music.

Promotion

Single
The album consists of one promotional single, "Second Love". The single achieved the biggest success along with its previous release, "Shoujo A", in her debut year. The single debuted at number 1 on the Oricon Single Weekly Chart and remained on the yearly chart at number 8. In the Best Ten Rankings, the single debuted at number 1 and remained in the 1982 yearly chart at number 62 and the 1983 yearly chart at number 33. The single received a reward for its composition in the Composition Awards and an Excellent Star Award from the National Cable Broadcasting Awards.

Music home video
On 1 May 1985, the second music home video Hajimemashita Nakamori Akina was released. This was Nakamori's third debut anniversary. The music video clips were filmed in United States, mainly in Los Angeles and Santa Monica. The filming of the music home video began before her debut, between 11 and 17 March 1982. From the original Fantasy album, was recorded only "Second Love".

Stage performances
Akina performs "Second Love" in her live tours very often and considered to be one of her personal favorite songs.

Most of the songs were performed in the live tour Milky Way in 1983, such as "Ruriiro no Yoru he", "Nigiwai no Kisetsu he", "Kizudarake no Love" and "Aitsu wa Joke".

"Aventure" and "More Motto Koishite" were performed in the live tour Rainbow Shower in 1983.

"Me wo Tojite Excursion" was performed in the live Rainbow Shower in 1983 and Yume 91 Akina Nakamori Special Live in 1991.

Chart performance
The album reached number one on the Oricon Album Weekly Chart for four consecutive weeks, charted 26 weeks and sold over 615,700 copies. The album was ranked at number 4 on the Oricon Album Yearly Chart in 1983.

Track listing
All tracks arranged by Mitsuo Hagita.

Covers
Japanese singer-songwriter Takao Kisugi covered "Second Love" on his solo album VISITORS in 1983.

Japanese singer Yukari Itō covered "Second Love" on her cover album Touch Me Lightly in 2002.

References

1983 albums
Akina Nakamori albums
Warner Music Japan albums
Japanese-language albums